The Victorian Football League's 1898 finals series determined the premiers of the 1898 VFL season. Played under a new playoff system, the finals featured all eight teams, beginning on 27 August and concluding with the 1898 VFL Grand Final on 24 September.

Finals system
The VFL introduced a new system of finals for the 1898 season. Under the new arrangement the season was to take place as follows:
 The eight teams played each other in a home-and-away season of fourteen matches. At the end of the season, the team on top of the ladder (based on win–loss record, with percentage as a tie-breaker), was declared the Minor Premier.
The eight teams were split into two groups based on their position on the ladder at the end of the home-and-away season. The groupings were:
 Group A: teams finishing 1st, 3rd, 5th, and 7th.
 Group B: teams finishing 2nd, 4th, 6th, and 8th.
 Each group played a separate three-match round-robin tournament. These were known as "sectional matches". At the end of the sectional matches, a ladder was prepared for each of the groups, based on sectional matches only.

The finals then took place over one or two weeks as follows:
 Week One: one final was played between 1st Group A vs 1st Group B.
 If the winner in Week One was the Minor Premier, or the Minor Premier did not have at least eight premiership points from its sectional matches, then the winner of the match immediately became the Major Premier, and won the premiership for the season.
 If the winner in Week One was not the Minor Premier, and the Minor Premier had at least eight premiership points from its sectional matches, then the finals progressed to week two.
 Week Two: if required, one final was played between Minor Premier vs Winner Week one
 The winner of this match became the Major Premier for the season.

The essence of this format is that all teams had the chance to contest the major premiership, but the minor premier – as reward for its performances during the home-and-away season – had the right to challenge for the major premiership if it was either eliminated in the sectional rounds, or lost the first final. A stipulation was included to remove the minor premier's right to challenge if it performed poorly in the sectional rounds in order to prevent the team from resting its players or failing to take the sectional rounds seriously. The minor premier's right to challenge was not included in the original release of the fixture, but was added shortly before the start of the season.

The finals system was also used in an adapted form by the South Australian Football Association for three seasons from 1899 until 1901. The SAFA amended the system for its six team competition by having two sections of three teams instead of two sections of four teams; and in 1901 amended it for its seven-team competition by staging an entire seven-team round-robin without a final instead of splitting the teams into two sections. Under the SAFA's 1901 variation, the minor premier was entitled to two challenge matches instead of one.

Problems with the finals system
The finals system introduced this year was used for three seasons until 1900, and it had two drawbacks:

 Firstly, there was confusion over the allocation of the minor placings. On the Monday following the Grand Final between Fitzroy and Essendon, the football correspondent of The Age made it clear that he was not entirely sure which team should be thought to have finished second:

 Secondly, and more significantly, the system had the drawback that it allowed a team to claim the major premiership by playing well only at the end of the year, regardless of its form during the home-and-away season. This came to a head after the unsatisfactory conclusion to the 1900 VFL season, when  won the premiership after having finished sixth out of the eight teams after the home-and-away season with a 6-8 record. A similar outcome could have occurred in 1899, as South Melbourne reached the non-challenge final and lost by one point to Fitzroy, despite having finished sixth with a record of 5-9 at the end of the home-and-away season.

Consequently, from the 1901 season, this scheme was replaced with the Argus system.

Matches

Section allocations
The clubs were divided into two groups for the sectional rounds as follows. The minor premiership was won by Essendon.

Sectional round results

Sectional Round 1

Sectional Round 2

Sectional Round 3

Sectional ladders

Bracket
The two sectional round winners met in the semi-final. Having won the minor premiership, and scoring eight premiership points in the sectional round,  had the right to challenge the semi-final winner in the grand final.

Semi-final
The semi-final saw  host  at the Brunswick Street Oval. The two teams had never met in a finals match before. In a low scoring contest, Fitzroy won with a goal from Potter at the end of the match.

Grand Final

The grand Final saw  meet  on a neutral ground. This was the first meeting between the two sides in finals. After much disagreement about which ground should host the grand final, the two teams decided to meet on the Junction Oval. Fitzroy's fast start helped it to win the match by fifteen points.

See also 
 1898 VFL season

References 

1898 in Australian rules football
Australian Football League